Heletje Van Staden (born 12 March 1988) is a Namibian professional racing cyclist. In 2010, she won the Namibian National Road Race Championships.

Major results

2010
 1st  Road race, National Road Championships
2011
 African Road Championships
6th Time trial
7th Road race 
2012
 National Road Championships
2nd Road race
2nd Time trial
2013
 7th Time trial, African Road Championships
2014
 National Road Championships
2nd Road race
3rd Time trial
2015
 4th Road race, National Road Championships

References

External links
 
 

1988 births
Living people
Namibian female cyclists
Place of birth missing (living people)
20th-century Namibian women
21st-century Namibian women